Diocese of Rockhampton could refer to:

 Anglican Diocese of Rockhampton
 Roman Catholic Diocese of Rockhampton